The ambassador of the United Kingdom to Estonia is the United Kingdom's foremost diplomatic representative in the Republic of Estonia, and head of the UK's diplomatic mission in Tallinn. The official title is His Britannic Majesty's Ambassador to the Republic of Estonia.

The United Kingdom first recognised Estonian independence during the Russian Civil War, and the two countries exchanged envoys for over twenty years. The United Kingdom refused to recognise the Soviet Union's unilateral annexation of Estonia in 1940, and the de facto non-independence caused the UK to close its mission and sever diplomatic ties with Estonia as a result. In 1991, upon restoration of de facto independence, the United Kingdom reestablished diplomatic links with Estonia, and the two countries resumed their exchange of ambassadors.

List of heads of mission

Envoy Extraordinary and Minister Plenipotentiary
From 1921 to 1940, British Ministers to Latvia, based in Riga, were also accredited to Estonia and Lithuania.

1921–1922: Ernest Wilton
1922–1927: Sir Tudor Vaughan
1928–1930: Joseph Addison
1931–1934: Hughe Knatchbull-Hugessen
1934–1937: Sir Edmund Monson, 3rd Baronet
1937–1940: Sir Charles Orde
1940: Wilfred Hansford Gallienne

No representation 1940–91. Estonia was incorporated into the Soviet Union in 1940, and regained its independence in 1991.

Ambassador
1991–1994: Brian Low
1994–1997: Charles de Chassiron
1997–2000: Timothy Craddock
2000–2003: Sarah Squire
2003–2007: Nigel Haywood
2007–2012: Peter Carter
2012–2016: Christopher Holtby
2016–2021: Theresa Bubbear

-present: Ross Allen

External links
UK and Estonia, gov.uk

References

Estonia
 
United Kingdom